Gail Rowell-Ryan (born 11 January 1939) is a film and television hairdresser.

Biography 
Gail Rowell-Ryan was born in Cincinnati, Ohio in 1939. Her career spanned over five decades, from 1974 to 2021. She is best known for her work with celebrities such as Benicio Del Toro, Naomi Watts, Dustin Hoffman, Sean Penn, Leslie Nielsen, Ray Liotta, and Nick Nolte.

Rowell-Ryan married makeup artist Robert Ryan on March 4, 1989. The couple divorced on January 16, 2002.

Awards and nominations

Won

 2014 Hollywood Makeup Artist and Hair Stylist Guild Award - Hair Stylists Lifetime Achievement Award
 2001 Academy Award, Best Makeup and Hairstyling - How the Grinch Stole Christmas
 2001 Saturn Award, Best Make-up - How the Grinch Stole Christmas
 2001 BAFTA Film Award, Best Make Up/Hair - How the Grinch Stole Christmas
 2001 Hollywood Makeup Artist and Hair Stylist Guild Award - Best Innovative Hair Styling - How the Grinch Stole Christmas

Nominated
 2018 Primetime Emmy, Outstanding Hairstyling for a Multi-Camera Series or Special - Dancing with the Stars
 2015 Primetime Emmy, Outstanding Hairstyling for a Multi-Camera Series or Special - Dancing with the Stars
 2014 Primetime Emmy, Outstanding Hairstyling for a Multi-Camera Series or Special - Dancing with the Stars
 2013 Primetime Emmy, Outstanding Hairstyling for a Multi-Camera Series or Special - Dancing with the Stars
 2010 Primetime Emmy, Outstanding Hairstyling for a Multi-Camera Series or Special - The 82nd Annual Academy Awards
 2000 Daytime Emmy, Outstanding Achievement in Makeup - Donny & Marie (1998)
 1999 Primetime Emmy, Outstanding Hairstyling for a Miniseries, Movie or a Special - The Rat Pack
 1999 Daytime Emmy, Outstanding Hairstyling - Donny & Marie
 1994 Primetime Emmy, Outstanding Individual Achievement in Hairstyling for a Miniseries or a Special - The 66th Annual Academy Awards

References

External links
 
 "Makeup Artists and Hair Stylists: A Forum on Contemporary Technique"
 "NY Times - Biography of Gail Ryan"

1939 births
Living people
American hairdressers
Best Makeup Academy Award winners
Best Makeup BAFTA Award winners
People from Cincinnati